The Samsung Galaxy S20 is a series of Android-based smartphones designed, developed, marketed, and manufactured by Samsung Electronics as part of its Galaxy S series. They collectively serve as the successor to the Galaxy S10 series. The first three smartphones were unveiled at Samsung's Galaxy Unpacked event on 11 February 2020 while the Fan Edition model was unveiled at Samsung's Galaxy Unpacked event on 23 September 2020.

The S20 series consists of the flagship Galaxy S20 and Galaxy S20+ models differentiated primarily by screen size, the larger camera-focused model, the Galaxy S20 Ultra, and the cheaper flagship model, the Galaxy S20 FE. Key upgrades over the previous model, in addition to improved specifications, include a display with a 120 Hz refresh rate, an improved camera system supporting 8K video recording (7680×4320) for the first three models and a super-resolution zoom of 30–100x, depending on the model.

The first three phones were released in the United States on 6 March 2020 and in Europe on 13 March 2020, while the Fan Edition was released globally on 2 October 2020. The Galaxy S20 FE, S20, S20+, and S20 Ultra launch prices started at $699, $999, $1,199 and $1,399, respectively.

It is the first smartphone lineup to receive USB fast-charger certification from the USB Implementers Forum (USB-IF).

In May, a rugged variant for military use named "Tactical Edition" was released.

The Galaxy S20 was succeeded by the Galaxy S21, which was announced on 14 January 2021.

History 
The title of the phone was originally presumed to be the Galaxy S11, due to its being the logical extension from the predecessor, the Galaxy S10. However, successive leaks in January 2020 revealed the title of the phone to be the Galaxy S20, because it was released in the year of 2020. In addition, details regarding the phone were leaked widely before the release, to the extent that almost all details regarding the specifications and design of the phone were known before the release. Leaker Max Weinbach obtained the actual phone a month before the release, confirming everything the community already guessed. Commentators remarked that by February, "most everything the company is planning to introduce has already leaked out." In addition to charts on the phone's specifications, marketing material and images of the phones themselves in real life were leaked.

Design 

The Galaxy S20 series has a design similar to the Samsung Galaxy Note 10, with an Infinity-O display (first introduced on the Galaxy S10) containing a circular punch-hole in the top center this time for the frontal selfie camera. In a departure from past Galaxy S designs, the rear camera array is not centered, but located in the corner with a rectangular protrusion similar to that of the iPhone 11 and the Google Pixel 4. The S20 and S20FE houses three cameras while the S20+ has four cameras in the bump, while the S20 Ultra houses four cameras in a larger bump. S20 phones sold in Europe had news aggregator upday in partnership with Axel Springer SE preinstalled, triggering notifications. Global color options for the first three phones are Cloud Pink, Cloud White, Cloud Blue, Cosmic Grey and Cosmic Black while the Fan Edition has Cloud Lavender, Cloud Mint, Cloud Navy, Cloud White, Cloud Red, and Cloud Orange. Cosmic Grey is available in all size variants except for the S20 FE, while Cosmic Black is limited to the S20+ and S20 Ultra, Cloud Blue is limited to the S20 and S20+, and Cloud Pink is exclusive to the S20. For the S20+, Prism Blue, is exclusively sold in Korea, Best Buy in the United States and through T-Mobile, Samsung Nederland and Tele2 in the Netherlands, while Aura Red is exclusive to Korea Telecom, Vodafone UK, Malaysia, and United Arab Emirates. Cloud White availability varies by country; in the United States it is exclusive to Verizon for the S20 with Ultrawide Band support. The S20 is sold in Italy, the S20+ is sold in Italy and Spain, and the S20 Ultra is sold in China and Germany.
In June 2020, Verizon released the Galaxy S20 5G UW (Ultra Wideband). Differences from the S20 include the addition of mmWave, only 8 GB of RAM (compared to the usual 12 GB), and no microSD slot. Moreover, Samsung released the Galaxy S20+ 5G BTS Edition in the summer of 2020, with the color "Haze Purple."

Specifications

Hardware

Chipsets 
The S20 line comprises three models with various hardware specifications; international models of the S20 utilize the Exynos 990 system-on-chip, while the U.S., Canadian, Korean, Chinese and Japanese models utilize the Qualcomm Snapdragon 865.

Display 
A 1440p "Dynamic AMOLED 2X" is featured with HDR10+ support and "dynamic tone mapping" technology with the exception of the S20 FE which utilizes a more traditional 1080p "Super AMOLED" display with HDR10+ support and "dynamic tone mapping" technology. The S20, S20 FE, and S20+ have a 6.2-inch, 6.5-inch, and 6.7-inch display, respectively, while the S20 Ultra has a 6.9-inch display. Except for the S20 FE, displays have curved sides that slope over the horizontal edges of the device. All devices utilizes a wider 20:9 aspect ratio in addition to a 120 Hz refresh rate double that of the S10. The S20, S20+, and S20 Ultra utilizes an ultrasonic in-screen fingerprint sensor while the S20 FE utilizes a more traditional optical in-screen fingerprint sensor.

Storage 
The base amount of RAM is 6 GB with an additional 8 GB option for the S20 FE, while the base amount is 8 GB, with an additional 12 GB option for the S20 & S20+ and a 16 GB option for the S20 Ultra. 128 GB of internal storage is standard with the S20 FE offering a 256 GB option while the S20+ & S20 Ultra also offers 256 GB and 512 GB options, with up to 1 TB of expansion via the microSD card slot. Verizon's Galaxy S20 5G UW model is not equipped with a microSD slot.

Batteries 
The S20, S20 FE, S20+, & S20 Ultra contain non-removable 4000 mAh, 4500 mAh, 4500 mAh, and 5000 mAh Li-Po batteries respectively, and Qi inductive charging is supported at up to 15W as well as the ability to charge other Qi-compatible devices from the S20's own battery power, which is branded as “Samsung PowerShare”. Wired charging is supported over USB-C at up to 25W for the S20, S20 FE, & S20+ and 45W for the S20 Ultra.

They support reverse charging at 4.5W.

Connectivity 
The S20 series comes with 5G standard connectivity, though some regions may have special LTE variants. However, only Verizon models are compatible with higher-speed millimeter-wave networks. The 3.5 mm audio jack has been omitted entirely.

Cameras 

The cameras on the Galaxy S20 series improved considerably over its predecessors, although unlike the S9 and S10, the aperture on the main lens is fixed. While the megapixels of the main and ultra wide sensors remained unchanged on the S20 and S20+, the telephoto sensor received some improvements. The 64-megapixel telephoto camera, branded as “Space Zoom”, supports 3X hybrid optical zoom (branded as "Hybrid Optic Zoom") and 30X digital zoom at 64 megapixels on the new telephoto sensor instead of 12 megapixels at two times on the S10 and 30 times digitally (branded as "Super-Resolution Zoom").

The S20+ receives a time-of-flight sensor (branded as "DepthVision Camera") in addition to the regular S20's cameras. The Galaxy S20 Ultra has a quadruple lens setup that supports 4X optical zoom and 100X digital zoom, with a 108-megapixel wide image sensor, a 12-megapixel ultra-wide sensor and a 48-megapixel periscope telephoto sensor accompanied by a time-of-flight sensor. Both the wide-angle and telephoto sensors use pixel binning to output higher quality images at a standard resolution, with the wide-angle sensor using Nonacell technology which groups 3x3 pixels to capture more light.

The front camera is able to record video footage at 2160p.

A new camera mode was introduced called Single Take, which allows users to capture photos or videos at the same time with different sensors automatically. The S20, S20+, and S20 Ultra can also record 8K videos at 24fps with a bit rate of 80 Mbps, which will consume about 600 MB of storage per minute. On the S20 and S20+, this is enabled by the 64 MP telephoto sensor, whereas the S20 Ultra's 108 MP wide sensor natively supports 8K video.

Supported video modes 
The Samsung Galaxy S20 series supports the following video modes:

 8K@24fps (not available for the S20 FE)
 4K@30/60fps
 1080p@30/60fps
 1080p@240fps
 720p@960fps (720p480fps upscale to 720p960fps on S20 Ultra)

All models can record at 720p30, 1080p30 or 4k30 with HDR10+, they can record with HEVC codec without HDR10+

Software 
All four phones initially ran on Android 10 and Samsung's custom skin One UI 2.1. In early December 2020, Samsung began releasing the Android 11 update with One UI 3 to all models. In January of 2022, all four phones has received the OneUI 4 update based on Android 12. In November 2022, all four phones has received the OneUI 5 update based on Android 13.

Software support

On 18 August 2020, Samsung revealed that all variants of the S20 series would be supported for three generations of Android software updates, and 4 years of security updates.

Known issues 

Even before the general release, reviewers have seen autofocus and skin smoothing issues with the cameras, especially with the Galaxy S20 Ultra. Samsung is working on a fix, but the Exynos model continues to have autofocus issues after an update that was supposed to fix them.

Galaxy S20 Ultra can only record at 720p480fps and it upscales with AI to 720p960fps, Galaxy S20 and S20+ can record at 720p960fps.

Users have reported that the Snapdragon version has GPS lock issues. The Exynos model is also known to have heating issues. Some devices also suffer from green display tint issues after a software update. The camera glass has been reported of spontaneously cracking, particularly on the Ultra version.

Some users reported instances of the Galaxy S20 FE suffering from touchscreen issues such as "ghost" touches and jittery movement when scrolling or zooming. Samsung attempted to fix the issue with several updates.

Some users in India reported that after being updated to One UI 4.01, a vertical line started appearing on the front display. These devices were out of warranty and Samsung India concluded it was user error. They charged around 16,000 INR to those users who were looking for a screen replacement. Around a thousand affected users tweeted about it asking for help and others decided to take legal action. Samsung India has still failed to acknowledge this issue.

Samsung Galaxy S20 Tactical Edition 
The Samsung Galaxy S20 Tactical Edition (TE) is a touchscreen-enabled, slate-format Android smartphone designed, developed, and marketed by Samsung Electronics.

The device is built matching the needs of operators in the federal government and Department of Defense. The mobile is Commercial Solutions for Classified Program (CSfC) component approved, with support to night vision, stealth mode, drone feeds and laser range finders. It can connect to tactical radios and mission systems, and runs applications like Battlefield assisted trauma distributed observation kit (BATDOK) etc.

External links 
 Official website

Notes

See also 
 Digital zoom § iZoom
 Samsung Galaxy
 Samsung Galaxy S series
 Exynos
 List of Qualcomm Snapdragon processors
 AMOLED

References

External links 

 

Android (operating system) devices
Samsung Galaxy
Discontinued flagship smartphones
Samsung smartphones
Mobile phones introduced in 2020
Mobile phones with multiple rear cameras
Mobile phones with 8K video recording